"This One Eats Souls" is a single by The Blackeyed Susans, released in July 1994, from their 1993 album, All Souls Alive. The last four tracks are taken from the cassette album Hard Liquor, Soft Music by The Blackeyed Susans Trio.

Allmusic's Ned Raggett describes the song as being "an absolutely bereft-of-hope lyric given beautiful, haunting music."

The song was included on the band's 2009 compilation album Reveal Yourself 1989-2009 and was re-recorded by Rob Snarski on his 2014 solo album, Wounded Bird.

Track listing

Personnel

Track 1
 Rob Snarski – vocals, acoustic guitar
 Phil Kakulas – double bass, sound effects
 Graham Lee – pedal steel
 Warren Ellis – violins, accordion, piano, harpsichord
 Metronome – metronome

Tracks 2-5 
 Rob Snarski – vocals, acoustic guitar
 Phil Kakulas – double bass
 Graham Lee – pedal steel, electric guitar, backing vocals
 Chris Copping – piano on track 4
Recorded by Andy Parsons at Fortissimo Studios, Melbourne in late 1993

References

The Blackeyed Susans songs
1994 singles
1993 songs
Songs written by David McComb
Shock Records singles